The 2011–12 Iowa State Cyclones men's basketball team represents Iowa State University during the 2011–12 NCAA Division I men's basketball season. The Cyclones were coached by Fred Hoiberg, who was in his 2nd season. They played their home games at Hilton Coliseum in Ames, Iowa and competed in the Big 12 Conference.

Previous season

The Cyclones finished 16-16, and 3-13 in Big 12 play to finish tied for 12th in the regular season conference standings.  They lost to Colorado in the first round of the Big 12 tournament.

Offseason departures

Recruiting

Prep recruits

Incoming transfers

Preseason

In August 2011 the team took a week-long trip to Italy.  In addition to playing several scrimmages against local teams they were able to tour Milan, Florence, the Colosseum, the Vatican, and other landmarks.

Roster

Schedule and results

|-
!colspan=12 style=""|Exhibition
|-

|-
!colspan=12 style=""| Regular Season
|-

|-
!colspan=12 style=""| Big 12 Tournament
|-

|-
!colspan=12 style=""| NCAA Tournament
|-

|-

Rankings

Awards and honors

All-American

Royce White (Honorable Mention)

All-Conference Selections

Royce White (1st Team)
Scott Christopherson (3rd Team)
Chris Allen (Honorable Mention)
Melvin Ejim (Honorable Mention)

Big 12 Coach of the Year

Fred Hoiberg

Academic All-Big 12 First Team

Scott Christopherson
Bubu Palo
Melvin Ejim

Ralph A. Olsen Award

Royce White

References

Iowa State Cyclones men's basketball seasons
Iowa State
Iowa State
Iowa State Cyc
Iowa State Cyc